Manuel Guerrero (13 October 1896 – 18 July 1947) was a Chilean footballer. He played in four matches for the Chile national football team in 1916. He was also part of Chile's squad for the 1916 South American Championship.

References

External links
 

1896 births
1947 deaths
Chilean footballers
Chile international footballers
Place of birth missing
Association football goalkeepers